Eleanor Mary Josaitis (née Reed; December 17, 1931 – August 9, 2011) was the co-founder of Focus: HOPE.

Work 
Josaitis was engaged in building the legacy of Focus: HOPE and for many years was the Associate Director. Upon the executive director Fr William Cunningham's death in 1997, she succeeded him and later became the CEO. 

She also provided leadership and advocacy for the Commodity Supplemental Food Program and made important contributions to public awareness of hunger and malnutrition. Working with co-founder Cunningham, she helped develop Centers of Opportunity education and training programs to help primarily underrepresented minorities gain access to jobs and careers. She served on numerous board and committees, including The National Workforce Alliance Board, the Michigan Council for Labor and Economic Growth, and the Advisory Board for the Arab-American and Chaldean Council. In 2002 she was named one of the most influential women in Detroit by Crain's Detroit Business.

In 2006, she turned over the day-to-day operation to a new leadership team in order to focus her efforts on fundraising. She died of peritoneal cancer on August 9, 2011 in Livonia, Michigan.

Legacy
Josaitis was widely known and respected throughout Metro Detroit for her work in the community, and had been referred to as "Detroit's Mother Theresa" before her death. U.S. Senator Carl Levin gave the eulogy at her funeral mass, quoting her exhortation to "Recognize the dignity and beauty of every person, and take practical action to overcome racism, poverty and injustice."

In her memory, the Detroit Free Press and Detroit Metropolitan Affairs Coalition annually present the Eleanor Josaitis Unsung Hero Award, which "recognizes an individual who may not have yet received the widespread recognition she or he deserves for long-standing efforts to further regional cooperation and understanding."

Awards 
 1999 “Distinguished Warrior” by the Detroit Urban League
 Anti-Defamation League's Women of Achievement Award
 Arab American Institute Foundation's Khalil Gibran Spirit of Humanity Award
 Assumption University's Christian Culture Series Gold Medal Award
 Boy Scouts of America's Good Scout Award
 City Year Detroit Lifetime of Idealism Award 
 Clara Barton Ambassador Award 
 Detroit NAACP Presidential Award
 Education Award from Society of Automotive Engineers
 Ford Employees African-Ancestry Network's 2002 Heritage Award
 Jeffery W. Barry Award for Educational Excellence and Service from Walsh College 
 Marygrove College's Theresa Maxis Award
 National Council of Negro Women's Achiever Award
 Peacemaker Award from Wayne State University's Center for Peace and Conflict Studies
 The Detroit News Michiganian of the Year
 The National Council of Women of the United States Inc.'s Woman of Conscience Award
 University of Michigan School of Business Administration Leadership Award
 Wade McCree Award from the Federal Bar Association
 Woman of the Year by YWCA of Western Wayne County 
 Wonder Woman Award by the Women's Survival Center of Oakland County
 National Caring Award from the Caring Institute in Washington D.C.

References

External links
 Lawrence Technological University Interview

American civil rights activists
Women civil rights activists
1931 births
2011 deaths
Deaths from cancer in Michigan
Deaths from peritoneal cancer